Rabbi Shaul Brus (1919–2008 ) was a Rosh Yeshiva in Yeshiva Beis HaTalmud.

Rabbi Brus was born in Sawin, Poland to a family of Trisker Hasidim. At the age of 16, after having studied in the Yeshiva in Pinsk from the age of 11, Shaul Brus was accepted into the Knesses Beis Yitzchak yeshiva of Rabbi Boruch Ber Leibowitz in Kaminetz. There he became a close student of Rabbi Leibowitz and devoted his life to expounding on his teacher's Talmudic methodology.

He was exiled to Siberia during the Holocaust and eventually found refuge in America, where he became a Talmudic lecturer at Yeshiva Beis HaTalmud in Bensonhurst, Brooklyn. He stayed at this position for over half a century. In reference to Rabbi Brus's devotion and diligence to Torah study, Rabbi Brus is reputed to have always been at the side of his Gemara and never attended any public gatherings.

He suffered a serious stroke in November 2006, from which he never recovered. He died on June 9, 2008 on the second day of the holiday of Shavuot.

Works
Rabbi Shaul Brus wrote and authored several volumes of Minchas Shaul (Hebrew: מנחת שאול) on various tractates of the Talmud. Posthumously, some of his Talmudic lectures have been printed by his children and students.

References

External links
Minchas Shaul on Google Books
The Grave of Rabbi Shaul Brus

1919 births
2008 deaths
American Orthodox rabbis
American people of Polish-Jewish descent
Rosh yeshivas